Boucard's wren (Campylorhynchus jocosus) is a species of bird in the family Troglodytidae. It is endemic to Mexico.

Taxonomy and systematics

Boucard's wren has sometimes been considered conspecific with the spotted wren (Campylorhynchus gularis) but molecular data show that they are not closely related. The species is monotypic.

Description

The male has a chocolate crown, reddish nape, blackish shoulders with white streaks, a reddish-brown back with black and white spots, and a dull reddish rump. Its tail is gray-brown with dark brown bars and the outermost feathers have white tips. It has a dull white supercilium and blackish eyestripe; the rest of the face is dark gray. Its chin and throat are unmarked white and the underparts are white with black spots. Its flanks are buffy with darker bars. The female is similar but for smaller spots on the underparts. The markings on the juvenile's back are less well defined than the adult's, its throat is speckled, and its underparts are grayish with dull, diffuse, spots.

Distribution and habitat

Boucard's wren is found in south-central Mexico, in the states of Puebla, Morelos, Guerrero, and Oaxaca. It inhabits dry to arid forest that sometimes has giant cacti; examples are pine-oak woodland, oak scrub, and subtropical scrub. It is very tolerant of habitat disturbance.

Behavior

Feeding

Boucard's wren forages from ground level to the tops of trees and cacti but seldom on the ground itself. Its diet includes both animal and vegetable matter such as insects and cactus seeds.

Breeding

Boucard's wren was observed building a nest in April, and nests with eggs were found in Oaxaca between mid-June and early July. The nests are domes with a side entrance. The clutch sizes were three to four.

Vocalization

The Boucard's wren song is "a series of grating notes" . It also produces "a harsh rapid chatter" . The sexes sing in unison.

Status

The IUCN has assessed Boucard's wren as being of Least Concern. Its population is estimated to be at least 20,000 individuals and is believed to be stable.

References

Boucard's wren
Birds of Mexico
Endemic birds of Mexico
Boucard's wren
Boucard's wren
Taxonomy articles created by Polbot
Birds of the Sierra Madre del Sur
Tehuacán Valley matorral